Edward Glynne Millward, (28 June 1930 – 18 April 2020), also known as Tedi Millward, was a Welsh scholar and nationalist politician.

Education and marriage
Millward studied at Cathays High School in Cardiff and then the University College of South Wales, before becoming a lecturer.  He married Silvia Hart, with whom he had two children: Llio, an actress and singer, and Andras, an author and martial arts trainer, who died in October 2016.

Welsh language
Millward became active in Plaid Cymru. He jointly founded the Welsh Language Society (Cymdeithas yr Iaith) along with Welsh historian John Davies at a Plaid Cymru summer school in the summer of 1962. Millward stood for the party twice in Cardiganshire at the 1966 general election and Montgomeryshire in 1970, but was not elected.  In 1966, he was elected as Vice-President of Plaid. He had just completed a two-year term as Vice-President of Plaid Cymru when he was asked to teach Welsh to Prince Charles ahead of his investiture as Prince of Wales.  This took place over nine weeks at the University of Wales, Aberystwyth, prior to the investiture of the Prince of Wales on 1 July 1969.

Millward subsequently served as Plaid's spokesperson on water policy, in which role he advocated non-violent direct action against the construction of new reservoirs.  In 1976, he was libelled by Willie Hamilton, who claimed that he had been involved in terrorist activities while tutoring Charles; he received £1,000 in a settlement.

Millward subsequently focused on his career as an academic, lecturing in Welsh at Aberystwyth. In the early 1980s, he supported Gwynfor Evans' successful campaign for a Welsh language television station.  In 2003, he launched a campaign for a centre to commemorate Dafydd ap Gwilym.

In popular culture
His autobiography, was published in 2015.

He was played by Mark Lewis Jones in the Netflix series The Crown where he is shown teaching the Prince of Wales Welsh. The episode entitled “Tywysog Cymru” (Prince of Wales) was praised for using the Welsh language in much of its dialogue, and was described as "incredibly useful" in promoting Welsh around the world.

References

1930 births
Academics of Aberystwyth University
Alumni of Cardiff University
Plaid Cymru politicians
Welsh-speaking politicians
2020 deaths